Lesley Selander (May 26, 1900 – December 5, 1979) was an American film director of Westerns and adventure movies. His career as director, spanning 127 feature films and dozens of TV episodes, lasted from 1936 to 1968. Before that, Selander was assistant director on films such as The Cat and the Fiddle (1934), A Night at the Opera (1935), and Fritz Lang's Fury (1936).

To this day Selander remains one of the most prolific directors of feature Westerns in cinema history, having taken the helm for 107 Westerns between his first directorial feature in 1936 and 1967.  In 1956 he was nominated for the Directors Guild of America award for Outstanding Directorial Achievement in Television, for his work directing a 1954 episode of Lassie.

Filmography

References

External links

 
 
Lesley Selander, Western movies and Australia

1900 births
1979 deaths
Burials at Forest Lawn Memorial Park (Glendale)
Film directors from Los Angeles